Mahakali is the Hindu goddess of time and death in the goddess-centric tradition of Shaktism. 

Similar to Kali, Mahakali is a fierce goddess associated with universal power, time, life, death, and both rebirth and liberation. She is the consort of Bhairava, the god of consciousness, the basis of reality and existence. Mahakali, in Sanskrit, is etymologically the feminised variant of Mahakala, or Great Time (which is interpreted also as Death), an epithet of the deities Narasimha and Shiva in Hinduism.

Meaning
Mahakali's origin is contained in various Puranic and Tantric Hindu Scriptures (Shastras). In the texts of Shaktism, she is variously portrayed as the Adi-Shakti, the Primeval Force of the Universe, identical with the Ultimate Reality, or Brahman. She is also known as the (female) Prakriti or World as opposed to the (male) Purusha or Consciousness, or as one of three manifestations of Mahadevi (The Great Goddess) that represent the three Gunas or attributes in Samkhya philosophy. In this interpretation Mahakali represents Tamas or the force of inertia. A common understanding of the Devi Mahatmya ("Greatness of the Goddess") text, a later interpolation into the Markandeya Purana, considered a core text of Shaktism (the branch of Hinduism which considers Durga to be the highest aspect of Godhead), assigns a different form of the Goddess (Mahasaraswati, Mahalakshmi, and Mahakali) to each of the three episodes therein. Here, Mahakali is assigned to the first episode. She is described as an abstract energy, the yoganidra of Vishnu.

Iconography
Mahakali is most often depicted in blue/black complexion in popular Indian art.

Her most common four armed iconographic image shows each hand carrying variously a  crescent-shaped sword, a trishul (trident), a severed head of a demon and a bowl or skull-cup (kapala) catching the blood of the severed head. Her eyes are described as red with intoxication and in absolute rage, her hair is shown disheveled, small fangs sometimes protrude out of her mouth and her tongue is lolling. The blood of the demons she slays drips out of her lolling tongue, having consumed it. She is adorned with a garland consisting of the heads of demons she has slaughtered, variously enumerated at 108 (an auspicious number in Hinduism and the number of countable beads on a Japa Mala, similar to a rosary, for repetition of Mantras) or 50, which represents the letters of the Sanskrit alphabet, Devanagari, and wears a skirt made of demon arms.

Her ten headed (dashamukhi) image is known as the 10 Mahavidyas Mahakali, and in this form she is said to represent the ten Mahavidyas or "Great Wisdom (Goddess)s". She is sometimes shown sitting on a flaming grave or a rotting corpse. Her complexion is described as that of the night sky, devoid of stars. She is depicted in this form as having ten heads, thirty flaming eyes, ten arms, and ten legs but otherwise usually conforms to the four armed icon in other respects. Each of her ten hands is carrying an implement which varies in different accounts, but each of these represent the power of one of the devas, and are often the identifying weapon or ritual item of a given Deva.  The implication is that Mahakali subsumes and is responsible for the powers that these deities possess and this is in line with the interpretation that Mahakali is identical with Brahman.  While not displaying ten heads, an "ekamukhi" or one headed image may be displayed with ten arms, signifying the same concept: the powers of the various Gods come only through her grace.

In either one of these images she is shown standing on the prone, inert body of Shiva.  This is interpreted in various ways but the most common is that Mahakali represents Shakti, the power of pure creation in the universe, and Shiva represents pure Consciousness which is inert in and of itself.  While this is an advanced concept in monistic Shaktism, it also agrees with the Nondual Trika philosophy of Kashmir, popularly known as Kashmir Shaivism and associated most famously with Abhinavagupta.  There is a colloquial saying that "Shiva without Shakti is Shava" which means that without the power of action (Shakti) that is Mahakali (represented as the short "i" in Devanagari) Shiva (or consciousness itself) is inactive; Shava means corpse in Sanskrit and the play on words is that all Sanskrit consonants are assumed to be followed by a short letter "a" unless otherwise noted.  The short letter "i" represents the female power or Shakti that activates Creation. This is often the explanation for why she is standing on Shiva, who is her husband in Shaktism, and also the Supreme Godhead in Shaivism. Another understanding is that the wild destructive Mahakali can only stop her fury in the presence of Shiva the God of Consciousness, so that the balance of life is not completely overrun over by wild nature.

Kashmir Shaivism 
In Kashmir Shaivism, the highest form of Kali is Kalasankarshini, who is nirguna, formless and is often shown as a flame above the head of Guhyakali, the highest gross form of Kali. In Nepali Newar arts, both form and formless attributes of Kali are often envisioned in a single art form showing the hierarchy of goddesses in their tradition. She is like a divine actress in her own universal play who assumes the form and role of Sristi Kali, Rakta Kali, Yama Kali, Samhara Kali, Mrityu Kali, Rudra Kali, Mahakaala Kali, Paramaraka Kali, Kalagnirudra Kali, Martanda Kali, Sthitinasha Kali and Mahabhairavaghorachanda Kali who is none other than Kalasankarshini Kali.

Literature 

The Markandeya Purana describes Mahakali as Lakshmi after her slaying of Sumba and Nisumba:

In the same text, Mahakali is also described to have been created by Mahalakshmi, from her own form:

See also

 Durga
 Kali Puja
 Parvati
 Tridevi

References

Citations

Works cited

Other sources

External links 
 
 Shri Mahakali Chalisa

Death goddesses
Destroyer goddesses
Forms of Parvati
Hindu goddesses
Mahavidyas
Mother goddesses
Shaktism
Time and fate goddesses

gu:મહાકાળી